Cercospora cantuariensis is a fungal plant pathogen.

References

cantuariensis
Fungal plant pathogens and diseases
Fungi described in 1923